The Seattle International Foundation is a grant-making organization whose mission is to support Seattle-area nonprofit organizations engaged in international development, with a strategic focus on Central America.

History
The Seattle International Foundation was founded in 2006 by Bill Clapp and Paula Clapp to support Seattle's expanding international aid sector.

Projects
Bill Clapp has lobbied the U.S. federal government on behalf of Seattle International Foundation and Global Washington to sustain United States foreign aid.

References

External links

Non-profit organizations based in Seattle